George Maltby (1 October 1876 – 30 July 1924) was an English cricketer who played first-class cricket for Derbyshire in 1905.

Maltby was born in South Normanton, Derbyshire, the son of Samuel Maltby, a coal miner, and his wife Jane.

Maltby made his first-class debut for Derbyshire in the 1905 season against Warwickshire in July, hitting a duck in his debut innings and scoring 4 in the second. In the same week, Maltby appeared against Leicestershire with a similar performance. In his third and final first-class appearance in an innings defeat by Sussex at Hove, Maltby was not out at the close of play. Maltby was a right-handed batsman and played 6 innings in 3 matches with a top score of 7 not out and an average of 4.40. He bowled 5 overs but took no wickets.

Maltby died in Huthwaite, Nottinghamshire at the age of 48.

References

1876 births
1924 deaths
English cricketers
Derbyshire cricketers
People from South Normanton
Cricketers from Derbyshire
People from Huthwaite
Cricketers from Nottinghamshire